Deviant most commonly refers to deviant behavior, particularly in relation to social norms.

Deviant may also refer to:
 Deviant (comics), a fictional race of humanoids in the Marvel Comics universe
 Deviant (film), a short film by Benjamin Howard
 Deviant logic, a class of non-classical logics
 "Deviant" (CSI: Miami episode)
 A member of the DeviantArt online community

Music
 Deviant Records, an inactive trance music record label
 Deviant (Pitchshifter album), 2000
 Deviant (Regurgitate album), 2003

See also 
 The Deviants (disambiguation)
 Deviance (disambiguation)
 Deviation (disambiguation)